Paranoia is an instinct or thought process that is believed to be heavily influenced by anxiety or fear, often to the point of delusion and irrationality. Paranoid thinking typically includes persecutory beliefs, or beliefs of conspiracy concerning a perceived threat towards oneself (i.e. "Everyone is out to get me"). Paranoia is distinct from phobias, which also involve irrational fear, but usually no blame.

Making false accusations and the general distrust of other people also frequently accompany paranoia. For example, a paranoid person might believe an incident was intentional when most people would view it as an accident or coincidence. Paranoia is a central symptom of psychosis.

Signs and symptoms
A common symptom of paranoia is the attribution bias. These individuals typically have a biased perception of reality, often exhibiting more hostile beliefs. A paranoid person may view someone else's accidental behavior as though it is with intent or threatening.

An investigation of a non-clinical paranoid population found that feeling powerless and depressed, isolating oneself, and relinquishing activities are characteristics that could be associated with those exhibiting more frequent paranoia.
Some scientists have created different subtypes for the various symptoms of paranoia including erotic, persecutory, litigious, and exalted.

Due to the suspicious and troublesome personality traits of paranoia, it is unlikely that someone with paranoia will thrive in interpersonal relationships. Most commonly paranoid individuals tend to be of a single status.

According to some research there is a hierarchy for paranoia. The least common types of paranoia at the very top of the hierarchy would be those involving more serious threats. Social anxiety is at the bottom of this hierarchy as the most frequently exhibited level of paranoia.

Causes

Social and environmental
Social circumstances appear to be highly influential in paranoid beliefs. Based on data collected by means of a mental health survey distributed to residents of Ciudad Juárez, Chihuahua (in Mexico) and El Paso, Texas (in the United States), paranoid beliefs seem to be associated with feelings of powerlessness and victimization, enhanced by social situations. Potential causes of these effects included a sense of believing in external control, and mistrust which can be strengthened by lower socioeconomic status. Those living in a lower socioeconomic status may feel less in control of their own lives. In addition, this study explains that females have the tendency to believe in external control at a higher rate than males, potentially making females more susceptible to mistrust and the effects of socioeconomic status on paranoia.

Emanuel Messinger reports that surveys have revealed that paranoia can develop from parental relationships and untrustworthy environments. These environments could include being very disciplinary, stringent, and unstable. It was even noted that, "indulging and pampering (thereby impressing the child that they are something special and warrants special privileges)," can be contributing backgrounds. Experiences likely to enhance or manifest the symptoms of paranoia include increased rates of disappointment, stress, and a hopeless state of mind.

Discrimination has also been reported as a potential predictor of paranoid delusions. Such reports that paranoia seemed to appear more in older patients who had experienced higher levels of discrimination throughout their lives. In addition to this it has been noted that immigrants are quite susceptible to forms of psychosis. This could be due to the aforementioned effects of discriminatory events and humiliation.

Psychological
Many more mood-based symptoms, grandiosity and guilt, may underlie functional paranoia.

Colby (1981) defined paranoid cognition in terms of persecutory delusions and false beliefs whose propositional content clusters around ideas of being harassed, threatened, harmed, subjugated, persecuted, accused, mistreated, wronged, tormented, disparaged, vilified, and so on, by malevolent others, either specific individuals or groups (p. 518).
Three components of paranoid cognition have been identified by Robins & Post: a) suspicions without enough basis that others are exploiting, harming, or deceiving them; b) preoccupation with unjustified doubts about the loyalty, or trustworthiness, of friends or associates; c) reluctance to confide in others because of unwarranted fear that the information will be used maliciously against them (1997, p. 3).

Paranoid cognition has been conceptualized by clinical psychology almost exclusively in terms of psychodynamic constructs and dispositional variables. From this point of view, paranoid cognition is a manifestation of an intra-psychic conflict or disturbance. For instance, Colby (1981) suggested that the biases of blaming others for one's problems serve to alleviate the distress produced by the feeling of being humiliated, and helps to repudiate the belief that the self is to blame for such incompetence. This intra-psychic perspective emphasizes that the cause of paranoid cognitions is inside the head of the people (social perceiver), and dismisses the possibility that paranoid cognition may be related to the social context in which such cognitions are embedded. This point is extremely relevant because when origins of distrust and suspicion (two components of paranoid cognition) are studied many researchers have accentuated the importance of social interaction, particularly when social interaction has gone awry. Even more, a model of trust development pointed out that trust increases or decreases as a function of the cumulative history of interaction between two or more persons.

Another relevant difference can be discerned among "pathological and non-pathological forms of trust and distrust". According to Deutsch, the main difference is that non-pathological forms are flexible and responsive to changing circumstances. Pathological forms reflect exaggerated perceptual biases and judgmental predispositions that can arise and perpetuate them, are reflexively caused errors similar to a self-fulfilling prophecy.

It has been suggested that a "hierarchy" of paranoia exists, extending from mild social evaluative concerns, through ideas of social reference, to persecutory beliefs concerning mild, moderate, and severe threats.

Physical
A paranoid reaction may be caused from a decline in brain circulation as a result of high blood pressure or hardening of the arterial walls.

Drug-induced paranoia, associated with cannabis, amphetamines, methamphetamine and similar stimulants has much in common with schizophrenic paranoia; the relationship has been under investigation since 2012. Drug-induced paranoia has a better prognosis than schizophrenic paranoia once the drug has been removed. For further information, see stimulant psychosis and substance-induced psychosis.

Based on data obtained by the Dutch NEMESIS project in 2005, there was an association between impaired hearing and the onset of symptoms of psychosis, which was based on a five-year follow up. Some older studies have actually declared that a state of paranoia can be produced in patients that were under a hypnotic state of deafness. This idea however generated much skepticism during its time.

Diagnosis
In the DSM-IV-TR, paranoia is diagnosed in the form of:
 Paranoid personality disorder
 Paranoid schizophrenia (a subtype of schizophrenia)
 The persecutory type of delusional disorder, which is also called "querulous paranoia" when the focus is to remedy some injustice by legal action

According to clinical psychologist P. J. McKenna, "As a noun, paranoia denotes a disorder which has been argued in and out of existence, and whose clinical features, course, boundaries, and virtually every other aspect of which is controversial. Employed as an adjective, paranoid has become attached to a diverse set of presentations, from paranoid schizophrenia, through paranoid depression, to paranoid personality—not to mention a motley collection of paranoid 'psychoses', 'reactions', and 'states'—and this is to restrict discussion to functional disorders. Even when abbreviated down to the prefix para-, the term crops up causing trouble as the contentious but stubbornly persistent concept of paraphrenia".

At least 50% of the diagnosed cases of schizophrenia experience delusions of reference and delusions of persecution. Paranoia perceptions and behavior may be part of many mental illnesses, such as depression and dementia, but they are more prevalent in three mental disorders: paranoid schizophrenia, delusional disorder (persecutory type), and paranoid personality disorder.

Treatment
Paranoid delusions are often treated with antipsychotic medication, which exert a medium effect size. Cognitive behavioral therapy (CBT) improves paranoid delusions relative to control conditions according to a meta-analysis. A meta-analysis of 43 studies reported that metacognitive training (MCT) reduces (paranoid) delusions at a medium to large effect size relative to control conditions.

History
The word paranoia comes from the Greek παράνοια (paránoia), "madness", and that from παρά (pará), "beside, by" and νόος (nóos), "mind". The term was used to describe a mental illness in which a delusional belief is the sole or most prominent feature.  In this definition, the belief does not have to be persecutory to be classified as paranoid, so any number of delusional beliefs can be classified as paranoia. For example, a person who has the sole delusional belief that they are an important religious figure would be classified by Kraepelin as having 'pure paranoia'. The word “paranoia” is associated from the Greek word “para-noeo”. Its meaning was "derangement", or "departure from the normal". However, the word was used strictly and other words were used such as "insanity" or "crazy", as these words were introduced by Aurelius Cornelius Celsus. The term “paranoia” first made an appearance during plays of Greek tragedians, and was also used by sufficient individuals such as Plato and Hippocrates. Nevertheless, the word “paranoia” was the equivalent of “delirium” or “high fever”. Eventually, the term made its way out of everyday language for two millennia. “Paranoia” was soon revived as it made an appearance in the writings of the nosologists. It began to take appearance in France, with the writings of Rudolph August Vogel (1772) and François Boissier de Sauvage (1759).

According to Michael Phelan, Padraig Wright, and Julian Stern (2000), paranoia and paraphrenia are debated entities that were detached from dementia praecox by Kraepelin, who explained paranoia as a continuous systematized delusion arising much later in life with no presence of either hallucinations or a deteriorating course, paraphrenia as an identical syndrome to paranoia but with hallucinations. Even at the present time, a delusion need not be suspicious or fearful to be classified as paranoid. A person might be diagnosed with paranoid schizophrenia without delusions of persecution, simply because their delusions refer mainly to themselves.

Relations to violence
It has generally been agreed upon that individuals with paranoid delusions will have the tendency to take action based on their beliefs. More research is needed on the particular types of actions that are pursued based on paranoid delusions. Some researchers have made attempts to distinguish the different variations of actions brought on as a result of delusions. Wessely et al. (1993) did just this by studying individuals with delusions of which more than half had reportedly taken action or behaved as a result of these delusions. However, the overall actions were not of a violent nature in most of the informants. The authors note that other studies such as one by Taylor (1985), have shown that violent behaviors were more common in certain types of paranoid individuals, mainly those considered to be offensive such as prisoners.

Other researchers have found associations between childhood abusive behaviors and the appearance of violent behaviors in psychotic individuals. This could be a result of their inability to cope with aggression as well as other people, especially when constantly attending to potential threats in their environment. The attention to threat itself has been proposed as one of the major contributors of violent actions in paranoid people, although there has been much deliberation about this as well. Other studies have shown that there may only be certain types of delusions that promote any violent behaviors, persecutory delusions seem to be one of these.

Having resentful emotions towards others and the inability to understand what other people are feeling seem to have an association with violence in paranoid individuals. This was based on a study of paranoid schizophrenics' (one of the common mental disorders that exhibit paranoid symptoms) theories of mind capabilities in relation to empathy. The results of this study revealed specifically that although the violent patients were more successful at the higher level theory of mind tasks, they were not as able to interpret others' emotions or claims.

Paranoid social cognition
Social psychological research has proposed a mild form of paranoid cognition, paranoid social cognition, that has its origins in social determinants more than intra-psychic conflict. This perspective states that in milder forms, paranoid cognitions may be very common among normal individuals. For instance, it is not strange that people may exhibit in their daily life, self-centered thought such as they are being talked about, suspiciousness about others’ intentions, and assumptions of ill-will or hostility (i.e. people may feel as if everything is going against them). According to Kramer (1998), these milder forms of paranoid cognition may be considered as an adaptive response to cope with or make sense of a disturbing and threatening social environment.

Paranoid cognition captures the idea that dysphoric self-consciousness may be related with the position that people occupy within a social system. This self-consciousness conduces to a hypervigilant and ruminative mode to process social information that finally will stimulate a variety of paranoid-like forms of social misperception and misjudgment.  This model identifies four components that are essential to understanding paranoid social cognition: situational antecedents, dysphoric self-consciousness, hypervigilance and rumination, and judgmental biases.

Situational antecedents
Perceived social distinctiveness, perceived evaluative scrutiny and uncertainty about the social standing.
Perceived social distinctiveness: According to the social identity theory, people categorize themselves in terms of characteristics that made them unique or different from others under certain circumstances. Gender, ethnicity, age, or experience may become extremely relevant to explain people's behavior when these attributes make them unique in a social group. This distinctive attribute may have influence not only in how people are perceived, but may also affect the way they perceive themselves. 
Perceived evaluative scrutiny: According to this model, dysphoric self-consciousness may increase when people feel under moderate or intensive evaluative social scrutiny such as when an asymmetric relationship is analyzed. For example, when asked about their relationships, doctoral students remembered events that they interpreted as significant to their degree of trust in their advisors when compared with their advisors. This suggests that students are more willing to pay more attention to their advisor than their advisor is motivated to pay attention to them. Also students spent more time ruminating about the behaviors, events, and their relationship in general.
Uncertainty about social standing: The knowledge about the social standing is another factor that may induce paranoid social cognition. Many researchers have argued that experiencing uncertainty about a social position in a social system constitutes an adverse psychological state, one which people are highly motivated to reduce.

Dysphoric self-consciousness
Refers to an aversive form of heightened 'public self-consciousness' characterized by the feelings that one is under intensive evaluation or scrutiny. Becoming self-tormenting will increase the odds of interpreting others' behaviors in a self-referential way.

Hypervigilance and rumination
Self-consciousness was characterized as an aversive psychological state. According to this model, people experiencing self-consciousness will be highly motivated to reduce it, trying to make sense of what they are experiencing. These attempts promote hypervigilance and rumination in a circular relationship: more hypervigilance generates more rumination, whereupon more rumination generates more hypervigilance. Hypervigilance can be thought of as a way to appraise threatening social information, but in contrast to adaptive vigilance, hypervigilance will produce elevated levels of arousal, fear, anxiety, and threat perception. Rumination is another possible response to threatening social information. Rumination can be related to the paranoid social cognition because it can increase negative thinking about negative events, and evoke a pessimistic explanatory style.

Judgmental and cognitive biases
Three main judgmental consequences have been identified:
The sinister attribution error: This bias captures the tendency that social perceivers have to overattribute lack of trustworthiness to others.
The overly personalistic construal of social interaction: Refers to the inclination that paranoid perceiver has to interpret others’  action in a disproportional self-referential way, increasing the belief that they are the target of others’ thoughts and actions. A special kind of bias in the biased punctuation of social interaction, which entail an overperception of causal linking among independent events.
The exaggerated perception of conspiracy: Refers to the disposition that the paranoid perceiver has to overattribute social coherence and coordination to others’ actions.

Meta-analyses have confirmed that individuals with paranoia tend to jump to conclusions and are incorrigible in their judgements, even for delusion-neutral scenarios.

Research 
A study suggests that combining cognitive behavioral therapy (CBT) with SlowMo, an app that helps notice their "unhelpful fast-thinking" might be more effective for treating paranoia in people with psychosis than CBT alone.

See also

 Anxiety
 Apophenia
 Borderline personality disorder
 Case of Aimée
 Conspiracy theory
 Delusions of reference
 Distrust
 Fusion paranoia
 Ideas of reference
 Monomania
 Narcissistic personality disorder
 Paranoid fiction
 Paranoid personality disorder
 Post-traumatic stress disorder
 Pronoia
 Querulant
 Schizophrenia
 Schizotypal personality disorder
 Whispers: The Voices of Paranoia

References

Sources 

 American Psychiatric Association. Diagnostic and Statistical Manual of Mental Disorders (DSM-IV-TR: Fourth edition Text Revision) (2000)

Further reading
American Psychiatric Association (1994). Diagnostic and statistical manual of mental health disorders (4th ed). Washington DC: Author.
 
 Canneti, Elias (1962). Crowds and Power. Translated from the German by Carol Stewart. Gollancz, London. 1962.
Colby, K. (1981). Modeling a paranoid mind. The Behavioral and Brain Sciences, 4, 515 - 560.
Deutsch, M. (1958). Trust and suspicion. Journal of Conflict Resolution, 2, 265 - 279.

 Farrell, John (2006). Paranoia and Modernity: Cervantes to Rousseau. Cornell University Press.
 Freeman, D. & Garety, P. A. (2004). Paranoia: The Psychology of Persecutory Delusions. Hove: Psychology Press. 
 Igmade (Stephan Trüby et al., eds.), 5 Codes: Architecture, Paranoia and Risk in Times of Terror, Birkhäuser 2006. 
 Kantor, Martin (2004). Understanding Paranoia: A Guide for Professionals, Families, and Sufferers. Westport: Praeger Press. 
 Munro, A. (1999). Delusional disorder. Cambridge: Cambridge University Press. 

 Robins, R., & Post, J. (1997). Political paranoia: The politics of hatred. New Haven, CT: Yale University Press.
 Sant, P. (2005). Delusional disorder. Punjab: Panjab University Chandigarh. 
 Sims, A. (2002). Symptoms in the mind: An introduction to descriptive psychopathology (3rd edition). Edinburgh: Elsevier Science Ltd.

External links

 
Psychosis
Metaphors